Martin Chikomba (born August 19, 1983) who goes by the stage name Solyd The Plug, is a Zimbabwean-American businessman, record producer and Amapiano artist. He is the founder of Oak Media Group which is a record label. He is one of the co-founders of Mashroom Media.  Solyd The Plug is well known for his single Bella Ciao which is a remix of the popular song off the Netflix series Money Heist.

Early life

Despite being born in Zimbabwe Solyd the Plug spent most of his childhood in South Africa. He is based in Canada, after moving from Texas in United States of America.

Early career

In 2006, Solyd the Plug who was an events manager at  Brass Monkey Night Club in Bulawayo started DJaying.  At the time, Brass Monkey was regarded as one of the premier and exclusive night spots in the city, which catered to huge audiences because of it was large.

In 2007, he moved to South Africa where he doubled as a club DJ and music promoter.  He also featured on Channel O, MTV, and TRACE events as well as at the Durban July.

Solyd the Plug  and his business partner Themba Davids founded music publishing company Oak Media Group in 2010.  The company is based in South Africa and the United States. Oak Media Group has distributed over 800 music videos, to music channels such as Trace TV, Channel O and MTV.

Mashroom Media
In 2016, Solyd The Plug entered into a partnership with Zimbabwean musician ExQ and music producer DJ Tamuka and launched recording studio Mashroom Media.  Mashroom Media signed a number of upcoming talented Zimbabwean artists who include  Nutty O, Novi Keys, Shamisozw, Yoca and Spits Loui. In 2020, Mashroom Media underwent a transformation and was relaunched with a new recording studio. Following the disbanding of Jah Prayzah's Military Touch Movement
, Jah Prayzah endorsed the studio saying that he was looking forward to recording his first song at Mashroom Media.

Musical career
His first single Bella Ciao was released in April 2020. It is a remix of the theme song of television series Money Heist. Solyd's remix is done in South Africa's Amapiano style.  The song had over 2 million streams across different platforms.

His second single Press Play was released in June 2020 and featured South African music producer Tboy Daflame, famous for producing Sho Madjozi's hit song John Cena. In July 2020, Solyd released his third single August. He followed this up with another single Surrender in August.  On Surrender, Solyd the Plug worked with Tboy Daflame again.  His fifth single, Pirates of Mzansi was released in August.

Discography

List of Albums

List of singles

Nomination For Best Song

In February 2021, Solyd The Plug's song Bella Ciao was named as one of the five nominees for the Best Song By A Zimbabwean In The Diaspora award in the Star FM Listeners Choice Awards 2021.

The full nominees were:

 Solyd The Plug - Bella Ciao
 Noxi Guni -  My Melody
 Charlie Kay - Kumusha
 Valee Music - Watora Moyo
 Shasha - Send It Back

Promoting Upcoming Artists On Debut Album

Solyd The Plug featured a host of undiscovered talent on his debut album North Yanos.  The album featured upcoming artists from Bulawayo, USA, UK and Nigeria.  It was part of Solyd's efforts to give upcoming talented artists the platform to launch their careers.

Solyd also partnered with a studio in the City of Kings (Bulawayo) which is run by Dj Prince Eskhosini, where they will be mentoring
and assisting young artists.

Below are the upcoming artists who featured on the album as well as the tracks they featured on.

 North Amapiano Intro featuring DJ Swing, Alfred Kainga and Miss Kumbie; 
 Vibe featuring Toxic Chemical, DJ Naida and Reverb 7; 
 Lets Go featuring DJ Khumz, Boocy and Fish; 
 Yizo Lezinto featuring Moxican and 5iver; 
 Utshwala (2022 Edition) featuring DJ Prince Eskhosini and Stinah;
 Key to My Heart featuring Toxic Chemical and Halao Wu.

B4 You Crumble Music Business Series 

Solyd The  Plug also ran a weekly series on how the music business works titled B4 You Crumble. The series was hosted by Star FM radio personality and Tamy Moyo's manager RK The Music Doctor

References 

Living people
People from Masvingo
Zimbabwean musicians
1983 births